Rajah Tupas (baptized as Felipe Tupas;  1497 — 1568) was the last Rajah of Cebu in the Pre-Hispanic Indianized polity of Philippines. He was the son of Sri Parang the Limp, and the cousin of Rajah Humabon. He is known to have been baptized on March 21, 1568 at age 70, placing his birthdate at about 1497. He ruled Cebu with his peers until he was defeated by Miguel López de Legazpi's soldiers on April 27, 1565. On June 4, 1565, Tupas and Legaspi signed the Treaty of Cebu, which effectively gave Spain suzerainty over Cebu. He died later in 1568.

Notes

References

Bibliography

People from Cebu
Filipino datus, rajas and sultans
People of Spanish colonial Philippines
Filipino Roman Catholics
Converts to Roman Catholicism
16th-century monarchs in Asia
Year of death unknown
1497 births